Sorry to Bother You is the sixth and final studio album by American hip hop group The Coup. It was released on Anti- on October 30, 2012.

Background
In 2012, The Coup's frontman Boots Riley completed the first draft of the screenplay for the 2018 film Sorry to Bother You. While he would later direct the film from that screenplay, Riley had no way to produce the film in 2012. As such, The Coup made the album of the same name, which was inspired by the screenplay.

Music videos
Music videos were created for "The Magic Clap", "Land of 7 Billion Dances", "The Guillotine", and "Your Parents' Cocaine".

Critical reception
At Metacritic, which assigns a weighted average score out of 100 to reviews from mainstream critics, the album received an average score of 80 based on 15 reviews, indicating "generally favorable reviews".

PopMatters placed it at number 5 on the "Best Hip-Hop of 2012" list. Todd Martens of Los Angeles Times placed it at number 8 on the "Best of 2012 Pop Music: Albums" list.

Track listing

Charts

References

External links
 

2012 albums
The Coup albums
Anti- (record label) albums